MW 50 (Methanol-Wasser 50) was a 50-50 mixture of methanol and water (German: Wasser) that was often sprayed into the supercharger of World War II aircraft engines primarily for its anti-detonation effect, allowing the use of increased boost pressures. Secondary effects were cooling of the engine and charge cooling. Higher boost was only effective at altitudes below the full-throttle height, where the supercharger could still provide additional boost pressure that was otherwise wasted, while the smaller secondary effects were useful even above that altitude.

Composition
MW 50 is something of a misnomer, as it is actually a mixture of three fluids: 50% methanol acting primarily to achieve optimum anti-detonant effect, secondarily as an anti-freeze; 49.5% water; and 0.5% Schutzöl 39, an oil-based anti-corrosion additive. The similar MW 30 increased the water to 69.5% and decreased methanol to 30%. This increased the cooling performance but made it easier to freeze at -18 degrees C as opposed to -50 C for MW 50). As a result, this mixture was intended to be used for lower-altitude missions. EW 30 and EW 50 mixtures also existed, which substituted methanol with ethanol; in emergency, pure water could be used.

Effect
The effect of MW 50 injection could be dramatic.

Time limits
The increased power could be used for a maximum of 10 minutes at a time, much like the American war emergency power setting for their own aircraft, with at least five minutes between each application. Aircraft generally carried enough MW 50 for about two ten-minute periods of use, allowing them to increase their climb rate and level speed in combat for interception missions.

Applications
Fittings for MW 50 first appeared on the BMW 801D in 1942, but it never went into production for this engine because the cylinder heads developed micro-cracks when MW 50 was used. Instead, the DB 605-engined later versions of the Messerschmitt Bf 109 were fitted with an MW 50 injection system, beginning in early 1944. Later engine designs all included the fittings as well, notably the Junkers Jumo 213, which relied on it to increase non-boosted performance and tune the supercharger for higher altitudes.

Other systems
MW 50 was not the only charge cooling system to be used by the Germans. Some engines dedicated to high altitude included an intercooler instead, as they would be needing the cooling for longer periods of time. The 801D also included the ability to spray gasoline into the supercharger (the Erhöhte Notleistung [Increased Emergency Performance] system), in place of the MW 50. While this was not as effective, it did increase boost without the complexity of the additional tanking and plumbing.

See also
Water injection (engines)
War emergency power

References

Notes

Bibliography

 Bridgman, L, (ed.) (1989) Jane's fighting aircraft of World War II. Crescent. 

Aircraft engines

fr:Injection d'eau-méthanol